John Jermyn (born 30 March 1982) is a former Ireland men's field hockey international. Between 2002 and 2018 Jermyn made 179 appearances and scored 93 goals for Ireland. He represented Ireland at the 2007 and 2011 Men's EuroHockey Nations Championships and at the 2016 Summer Olympics. In 2012, Jermyn set the new record as career top goal scorer for Ireland, eventually increasing the record to 93 goals by the end of his career with the national team; his record was not broken until 2018.

Early years and education
Jermyn completed his elementary educated at St Luke's National School in Douglas, Cork.  Between 1996 and 2001 he attended Ashton School. Between 2005 and 2008 he attended University College Cork where he gained a BA in Economics and Geography. He also gained diplomas from the Law Society of Ireland in Employment Law and Legal Studies.

Domestic teams

Ashton School
Between 1997 and 2000 Jermyn was a member of the Ashton School team that played in four successive All Ireland Schoolboys Hockey Championship finals. He finished on the winning teams in both 1998 and 2000.

Cork Church of Ireland
In 1998–99 Jermyn was a member of the Cork Church of Ireland team that won the Irish Senior Cup. He was also a member of the Cork Church of Ireland team that played in the 2014–15 final, losing 2–1 after extra time to Banbridge. In 2015–16 Jermyn scored eleven goals, including three hat-tricks, for Cork Church of Ireland in the Men's Irish Hockey League. This led to him gaining a recall into the Ireland team for the 2016 Summer Olympics. In April 2017 Jermyn was awarded an honorary life membership by the Cork Church of Ireland club. As of 2018–19 he was still playing for the club in the Men's Irish Hockey League.

HGC
The 2007–08 season saw Jermyn play for HGC in the Hoofdklasse. Together with Iain Lewers, Eugene Magee and Barry Middleton, he was a member of the HGC team that finished as runners up in the 2007–08 Euro Hockey League.

Royal Pingouin
The 2012–13 season saw Jermyn play for Royal Pingouin in the Men's Belgian Hockey League. The club agreed fly him to Belgium on weekends for matches only, allowing him to continue his career as a solicitor in Cork.

Ireland international
Jermyn represented Ireland at Under-16, Under-18 and Under-21 levels before making his senior debut. Between 2002 and 2018 Jermyn made 179 appearances and scored 93 goals for Ireland. He made his senior debut  against Belgium in June 2002. Shortly after he scored his first goal for Ireland against Scotland. Jermyn was a member of the Ireland team that won the 2009 Men's EuroHockey Nations Trophy. In October 2009 he scored his 50th goal for Ireland against Scotland. In February 2010 he captained Ireland for the first time in a game against Scotland. Jermyn was also a member of the Ireland team that won a 2012–13 Men's FIH Hockey World League Round 1 tournament; on 7 September 2012, in an opening pool game against Wales, scored a goal that tied him with Stephen Butler as Ireland's all-time leading goal scorer, breaking the record the next night when he scored his 80th all-time in a game against Austria. He made his 150th appearance for Ireland at the 2012 Men's Hockey Champions Challenge I tournament. Between December 2012 and March 2016, Jermyn was effectively retired from the Ireland team. However his performances for Cork Church of Ireland in the Men's Irish Hockey League saw him recalled to the national team and he subsequently represented Ireland at the 2016 Summer Olympics. In June 2018, Jermyn scored his final goal, his 93rd all time for Ireland, in a 1–1 draw against France.

From September 2012 to December 2018, Jermyn heldand steadily increasedthe record for goals scored with the Irish national team, retiring from international competition with 93 goals; he was surpassed on 7 December 2018 by Shane O'Donoghue, who scored his 94th goal in a first round match against England at the 2018 Men's Hockey World Cup.

Personal life
Since May 2011 Jermyn has worked as a solicitor for Ronan, Daly, Jermyn Solicitors. Jermyn is also actively involved in the Church of Ireland. In March 2018 he was appointed assistant diocesan registrar by the Bishop of Cork, Cloyne and Ross, Paul Colton. His father, grandfather and great–grandfather have all previously held the same office.

Honours
Ireland
Men's EuroHockey Nations Trophy
Winners: 2009
Men's FIH Hockey World League Round 1
Winners: 2012 Cardiff
Men's Hockey Champions Challenge II 
Runners up: 2009
Men's Field Hockey Olympic Qualifier
Runners up: 2012
HGC
Euro Hockey League
Runners up: 2007–08
Cork Church of Ireland
Irish Senior Cup
Winners: 1998–99: 1
Runners up: 2014–15: 1
Ashton School
All Ireland Schoolboys Hockey Championship
Winners: 1998, 2000: 2
Runners up: 1997, 1999: 2

References

1982 births
Living people
Irish male field hockey players
Ireland international men's field hockey players
Olympic field hockey players of Ireland
Field hockey players at the 2016 Summer Olympics
Pembroke Wanderers Hockey Club players
HGC players
Men's Irish Hockey League players
Men's Hoofdklasse Hockey players
Sportspeople from Cork (city)
Expatriate field hockey players
Irish expatriate sportspeople in the Netherlands
Irish expatriate sportspeople in Belgium
Alumni of University College Cork
Irish Anglicans
Irish solicitors
Men's Belgian Hockey League players